The 1980–81 Hong Kong First Division League season was the 70th since its establishment.

League table

References
1980–81 Hong Kong First Division table (RSSSF)

Hong
Hong Kong First Division League seasons
1980–81 in Hong Kong football